Thelymitra improcera, commonly called the coastal sun orchid, is a species of orchid that is endemic to  south-eastern Australia. It has a single erect, fleshy leaf and up to eight relatively small pale to bright blue flowers on a short flowering stem. The lobe on top of the anther is unusually short and lobed.

Description
The lobe on the top of the anther is short with a yellow tip and small glands on the back. The side lobes have a long, mop-like tufts of white hairs. Flowering occurs from October to December but the flowers are self-pollinated and open only slowly on hot days.

Taxonomy and naming
Thelymitra improcera was first formally described in 1999 by David Jones from a specimen collected on King Island and the description was published in Australian Orchid Research. The specific epithet (improcera) is a Latin word meaning “short" or "undersized", referring to this species' flower size compared to T. media.

Distribution and habitat
The coastal sun orchid mostly grows in low-lying, moist heath and is found on King Island and in the far south-east of Victoria.

References

External links
 

improcera
Endemic orchids of Australia
Orchids of Victoria (Australia)
Orchids of Tasmania
Plants described in 1998